Adam Jason Shabala (born February 6, 1978) is a former outfielder in Major League Baseball who played one season for the San Francisco Giants in .

Drafted out of the University of Nebraska by the San Francisco Giants in the 10th round of the 2000 Major League Baseball Draft, Shabala played in six games for the Giants in 2005. Shabala became a free agent at the end of the  season and signed with the San Diego Padres on November 6. He was released by the Padres and signed with the Chicago White Sox, finishing the season playing for the Double-A Birmingham Barons.

External links

1978 births
Living people
San Francisco Giants players
People from Streator, Illinois
Nebraska Cornhuskers baseball players
Major League Baseball outfielders
Baseball players from Illinois
Salem-Keizer Volcanoes players
Hagerstown Suns players
San Jose Giants players
Shreveport Swamp Dragons players
Norwich Navigators players
Fresno Grizzlies players
Birmingham Barons players
Portland Beavers players